Roy Higgins (27 January 1900 – 24 February 1990) was an Australian cricketer. He played in twenty first-class matches for Queensland between 1925 and 1932.

See also
 List of Queensland first-class cricketers

References

External links
 

1900 births
1990 deaths
Australian cricketers
Queensland cricketers
Cricketers from Brisbane